The  was a Japanese samurai clan that ruled Mino province in the Sengoku period. The clan appropriated the name of a defunct samurai clan named "Saitō" that had previously hailed from Echizen province and claimed descent from Fujiwara Toshihito, of the Hokke branch of the Fujiwara clan.

History
The founder of the Saitō clan was Saitō Dōsan (1494–1556), who started out as a Buddhist monk, and later worked as a peddler selling cooking oil. In the 1520s, Dōsan's father was adopted into the Nagai clan, a minor samurai clan. In 1530, Dōsan murdered the head of the Nagai clan and took control of the clan for himself. In 1541, Dōsan attacked and overthrew the shugo of Mino province, Toki Yorinari. He then adopted the name "Saitō" from a defunct samurai clan and set himself up as the daimyō of Mino. For his ruthlessness, Dōsan was nicknamed .

Dosan was eventually defeated in 1549 by Oda Nobuhide. Nobuhide made peace with Dōsan by arranging a political marriage between his son and heir, Oda Nobunaga, and Dōsan's daughter, Nōhime. Dōsan, therefore, became the father-in-law of Oda Nobunaga.

Rumors had started to circulate that Dōsan's firstborn son, Saitō Yoshitatsu, was not his natural son and Dōsan started to consider another son, Kiheiji, or even his son-in-law Oda Nobunaga, as his heirs. This caused Yoshitatsu to rebel and kill his two younger brothers. In 1556, the forces of Dōsan and Yoshitatsu clashed in the Battle of Nagara-gawa which resulted in
the death of Dōsan.

Saitō Tatsuoki was the son of Yoshitatsu. Tatsuoki was defeated by Oda Nobunaga in 1567, and the clan was extinguished.

References

External links

 斎藤氏 on Harimaya.com 

 
Japanese clans